The following are some international rankings of Singapore.

Communications

Singapore has the world's fastest average peak Internet speed (Akamai, December, 2015).
 Singapore ranked 2nd out of 144 countries in the Global Information Technology Report 2014 by the World Economic Forum.

Demographics

CIA World Factbook: Total fertility rate 2014 estimate, ranked 224 out of 224 countries (0.80)
Population density ranked 3 out of 242 countries
United Nations: Population ranked 114 out of 233 countries
United Nations: World Population Policies 2005 number of immigrants, ranked 22 out of 192 countries
International Organization for Migration: 7th most cosmopolitan nation.

Economy

Singapore is ranked first worldwide for the ease of doing business by the World Bank for 2012, consecutively for 7 years. 
Singapore is ranked the #1 most competitive country in the world.
Singapore is the 14th most expensive city in the world to spend a night in.
The Economist: Where-to-be-born Index 2013, ranked 6 out of 111 countries
 , Singapore's external debt ranked 15 out of 202 countries.
Foreign exchange reserves ranked 10 out of 121 countries
Nominal GDP —
IMF: ranked 36 out of 188 countries (2014)
World Bank: ranked 36 out of 189 countries (2014)
Nominal GDP growth rate 2014 estimate: ranked 99 out of 198 countries
Nominal GDP per capita —
IMF: ranked 6 out of 186 countries (2015)
GDP (PPP) per capita —
IMF: ranked 3 out of 187 countries (2014)
World Bank: ranked 3 out of 185 countries (2014)
United Nations: Human Development Index 2014, ranked 9 out of 187 countries
The Wall Street Journal: Index of Economic Freedom 2021, ranked 1 out of 178 countries
World Economic Forum: Travel and Tourism Competitiveness Index 2013, ranked 10 out of 140 countries
World Tourism Organization: World Tourism rankings, ranked 29 out of all countries

Education

Ranked 1 in the 2015 OECD global education report

Energy
CIA World Factbook: refined petroleum consumption 2015, ranked 18 out of 215 countries
CIA World Factbook: oil consumption 2012, ranked 78 out of 211 countries

Environment

CIA World Factbook: water resources (2011 figures), ranked 160 out of 172 countries
New Economics Foundation: Happy Planet Index 2012, ranked 90 out of 151 countries
US Department of Energy: CO2 emissions per capita 2008, ranked 58 out of 214 countries
Save The Children: End of Childhood report 2018, ranked 1 out of 175 countries

Geography

CIA World Factbook: Total area ranked 190 out of 249 countries and oceans

Labour
 Singapore is ranked 59 out of 142 countries on the World Economic Forum Global Gender Gap Report.

Military

List of countries by Global Militarization Index: ranked 2 out of 152 countries

Politics and law

In 2015, Singapore was ranked 9th in the world in the Rule of Law Index by the World Justice Project.
The Economist: Democracy Index 2018, ranked 66 out of 167 countries
Reporters Without Borders: Worldwide Press Freedom Index 2017: ranked 151 out of 180 countries

Technology
UN e-Government Readiness Index, Singapore ranks 3rd.
 Singapore ranked 2nd out of 144 countries in the Global Information Technology Report 2014 by the World Economic Forum.
Networked Readiness Index, Singapore ranks 1st out of 139 countries.

Transportation

Others

Singapore is ranked third among Asian countries in 2014 on Gallup's Potential Net Migration Index.
Most expensive cities —
Economist Intelligence Unit: Cost of Living Survey 2014, ranked 1 out of 140 cities in the world 
Mercer: Worldwide Cost of Living Survey 2014, ranked 4 out of 211 cities

See also
List of international rankings
Lists of countries
Lists by country

References

Singapore